Daryoush Ayyoubi (born 30 August 1980) is an Iranian footballer who play for Persiram Raja Ampat in the Indonesia Super League.

References

External links
Daryoush Ayyoubi 

1980 births
Association football forwards
Iranian expatriate footballers
Iranian expatriate sportspeople in Indonesia
Iranian footballers
Expatriate footballers in Indonesia
Expatriate footballers in East Timor
F.C. Porto Taibesi players
Liga 1 (Indonesia) players
Living people
PSM Makassar players
Esteghlal F.C. players
People from Karaj
21st-century Iranian people